To instil or instill is to slowly but firmly establish something, and may refer to:

Instillation abortion, a method of induced abortion
Drug instillation, a method of giving a medication
Intratracheal instillation
USS Instill (AM-252), an American minesweeper